The 'Coolidge School is a former historic building at 319 Arlington Street in Watertown, Massachusetts. Managed by Hallkeen Management, It is a large two-story Classical Revival brick building with pressed stone trim on a granite foundation.  It was designed in its present configuration by local architects Clarence Hoyt and Curtis Bixby and built in two phases.  The first phase, built in 1915, was a U-shape structure that is the western portion of the building.  In 1925, the eastern wing was added, giving the building its present E shape.  The building replaced a previous four-room wood-frame schoolhouse on School Lane (now Bostonia Avenue) near Mount Auburn Street.  The new building, with ten rooms and a capacity for over 400 students, was used as an elementary school until 1984.  It was afterward used for various purposes, including office space and some educational use until it was formally closed in 2000.

The building was listed on the National Register of Historic Places in 2009.  The building has been converted to residential use.

See also
Old Watertown High School
National Register of Historic Places listings in Middlesex County, Massachusetts

References

1913 establishments in Massachusetts
 Buildings and structures in Watertown, Massachusetts
 National Register of Historic Places in Middlesex County, Massachusetts
 School buildings completed in 1913
 School buildings on the National Register of Historic Places in Massachusetts
 Schools in Middlesex County, Massachusetts